Chapman Run is a  tributary of Shaffer Creek in Bedford County, Pennsylvania, in the United States.

Chapman Run and Brush Creek join near Clearville to form Shaffer Creek.

See also
List of rivers of Pennsylvania

References

Rivers of Pennsylvania
Tributaries of the Juniata River
Rivers of Bedford County, Pennsylvania